The men's light flyweight event was part of the boxing programme at the 1984 Summer Olympics. The weight class was the lightest contested, and allowed boxers of up to 48 kilograms to compete. The competition was held from 30 July to 11 August 1984. 24 boxers from 24 nations competed.

Medalists

Results
The following boxers took part in the event:

First round
 Rafael Ramos (PUR) def. Carlos Salazar (ARG), walk-over
 Agapito Gómez (ESP) def. Mahjoub Mjirich (MAR), 3:2
 Marcelino Bolivar (VEN) def. Nelson Jamili (PHI), 5:0
 Carlos Motta (GUA) def. Mustafa Genç (TUR), 5:0
 Daniel Mwangi (KEN) def. Sanpol Sang-Ano (THA), RSC-3
 Yehuda Ben-Haim (ISR) def. Michael Dankwa (GHA), 4:1
 John Lyon (GBR) def. Alego Akomi (SUD), 5:0
 William Bagonza (UGA) def. Abbas Zaghayer (IRQ), RSC-2
 Paul Gonzales (USA) def. Kim Kwang-Sun (KOR), 5:0

Second round
 Mamoru Kuroiwa (JPN) def. Francisco Tejedor (COL), 4:1
 Keith Mwila (ZAM) def. Chung Pao Ming (TPE), RSC-2
 Salvatore Todisco (ITA) def. Gerard Hawkins (IRL), 5:0
 Rafael Ramos (PUR) def. Jesús Beltre (DOM), 4:1
 Marcelino Bolivar (VEN) def. Agapito Gómez (ESP), 4:1
 Carlos Motta (GUA) def. Daniel Mwangi (KEN), 4:1
 John Lyon (GBR) def. Yehuda Ben-Haim (ISR), 5:0
 Paul Gonzales (USA) def. William Bagonza (UGA), 5:0

Quarterfinals
 Keith Mwila (ZAM) def. Mamoru Kuroiwa (JPN), 5:0
 Salvatore Todisco (ITA) def. Rafael Ramos (PUR), 4:1
 Marcelino Bolivar (VEN) def. Carlos Motta (GUA), 5:0
 Paul Gonzales (USA) def. John Lyon (GBR), 4:1

Semifinals
 Salvatore Todisco (ITA) def. Keith Mwila (ZAM), 5:0
 Paul Gonzales (USA) def. Marcelino Bolivar (VEN), 5:0

Final
 Paul Gonzales (USA) def. Salvatore Todisco (ITA), walk-over

References

Light Flyweight